Karachi West District is an administrative district of Karachi Division in Sindh, Pakistan.

History 
The District was abolished in 2000 and divided into five towns namely: 
 
 Lyari Town
Kemari Town, 
 SITE Town, 
 Baldia Town 
 and Orangi Town.

On 11 July 2011 Sindh Government restored again Karachi West District.

In 2020, Kemari District was carved out from Karachi West District. So Keamari Town, SITE Town and Baldia Town ended up being part of Kemari District. Lyari became part of Karachi South district in 2015.

The district contains mix population including Sindhi, Baloch, Punjabis, Pashtuns and Muhajirs. No single ethnic group form established majority in the district.

Demographics
At the time of the 2017 census, Karachi West district had a population of 2,077,228, of which 1,081,887 were males and 995,197 females. The rural population was 160,904 (7.75%) and urban 1,916,324 (92.25%). The literacy rate is 68.29%: 71.27% for males and 65.03% for females.

The majority religion is Islam, with 98.06% of the population. Christianity is practiced by 1.61% of the population.

At the time of the 2017 census, 50.27% of the population spoke Urdu, 26.19% Pashto, 6.13% Punjabi, 3.83% Saraiki, 3.57% Sindhi, 3.09% Hindko, 2.70% Balochi and 1.07% Brahui as their first language.

Administrative Towns in Karachi West

Orangi Town

List of Dehs
The following is a list of Karachi West District's dehs, organised by taluka:

 Mauripur Taluka (9 dehs)
 Allah Banoo
 Chhatara
 Gabopat
 Gond Pass
 Lalbakhar
 Maindiyari
 Mann
 Moach
 Moachko
 Mangho Pir Taluka (11 dehs)
 Bijar Bhatti
 Bund Murad (P)
 Halkani
 Hub
 Jam Charkho
 Mai Garhi
 Manghopir
 Mukhi
 Nangan
 Surjani
 Taiser
 Orangi Taluka (1 deh)
 Orangi
 Baldia Taluka (2 dehs)
 Maouch-I
 Metan

See also 

 Keamari District

References

 
Districts of Sindh
Districts of Karachi